The Quilimarí River is a river of Chile. It arises from several small streams in the foothills of the Andes, and runs for some  westward to the mouth at Quilimarí on the Pacific coast.

See also
List of rivers of Chile

References

 EVALUACION DE LOS RECURSOS HIDRICOS SUPERFICIALES EN LA CUENCA DEL RIO BIO BIO

Rivers of Chile
Rivers of Coquimbo Region